Corresponding Members of the Russian Academy of Arts are artists, architects, designers and art critics.
Members of the Russian Academy of Arts include full members, corresponding members, honorary members, and foreign members. 
The Academy Assembly has the right to elect them. Membership is lifelong.
There are 311 art workers, including 107 women.

List of corresponding members of the Russian Academy of Arts

References

 
Russian Academy of Arts